Boten railway station is a railway station in Boten, Laos. It is the northernmost intermediate stop and the final stop in Laos on the Boten–Vientiane railway. It is marked 5th station completed on the China–Laos railway and is open with the line on 3 December 2021.

References 

Railway stations in Laos
Railway stations opened in 2021